The Normal College, Bangor was an independent teacher training college, founded in 1858. It was created through the efforts of the British and Foreign School Society and the educator Sir Hugh Owen, and was funded by £11,000 raised through subscription and £2,000 of Government money. Teaching began on temporary premises in January 1858 and the College opened on its permanent site in 1862.  In 1979 it changed its name to Y Coleg Normal, Bangor or in English: The Normal College, Bangor and in 1996 it became part of University of Wales Bangor.

The term "normal school" originated in the early 16th century from the French école normale. The French concept of an "école normale" was to provide a model school with model classrooms to teach model teaching practices to its student teachers, thus acting as a teacher training institute.

The old Normal campus is situated on the shores of the Menai Strait next to the School of Education and School of Sport, Health and Exercise Sciences and the closest residences to the School of Ocean Sciences in Menai Bridge. The site has two self-catered halls or residence: Neuadd Seiriol and Neuadd Arfon.

In the 1960s one of the first pro-language campaigns in Wales was by 20 of the college lectures for Welsh salary cheques, led by Owain Owain, which was successful. 

The college was originally set up through the efforts of the a local community and Sir Hugh Owen to the tune of £11,000 and £2,000 of government money.

Among renowned  students and lecturers are:
 Owen Prys
 Gerallt Lloyd Owen
 Ryan Davies
 John Lasarus Williams
 Owain Owain
 Selwyn Griffith (Selwyn Iolen), Archdruid and crowned poet
 Hafina Clwyd, journalist
 Windsor Davies, Teacher who became an actor
 Ryan Davies, Welsh comedian, entertainer and musician.   

The college was integrated into Bangor University (then University College of North Wales) in 1996.

References

External links

University of Wales
Bangor University
Teacher training colleges in the United Kingdom
Grade II listed buildings in Gwynedd
1858 establishments in the United Kingdom